Pran Nath may refer to:
Pran Nath (musician) (1918–1996), Indian singer of the Kirana style
Pran Nath (physicist) (born 1939), Indian particle physicist (1939-present)